Henry Raymond Sartori (31 March 1885 – 14 April 1961) was an Australian rules footballer who played with Essendon in the Victorian Football League (VFL).

Notes

External links 
		

1885 births
1961 deaths
Australian rules footballers from Victoria (Australia)
Essendon Football Club players
Daylesford Football Club players